The Guest is a 2014 American thriller film directed by Adam Wingard and written by Simon Barrett. The film stars Dan Stevens and Maika Monroe, with a supporting cast that includes Leland Orser, Sheila Kelley, Brendan Meyer, and Lance Reddick. It tells the story of a U.S. soldier (Stevens) called David who unexpectedly visits the Peterson family, introducing himself as a friend of their son who died in combat in Afghanistan. After he has been staying in their home for a couple of days, a series of deaths occur, and the daughter Anna (Monroe) suspects David is connected to them.

Barrett, who previously worked with Wingard on the films A Horrible Way to Die (2010) and You're Next (2011), wrote the script for The Guest. Budgeted at $5 million, filming took place in New Mexico during the summer of 2013. Musician Steve Moore scored the film's soundtrack. The film premiered at the Sundance Film Festival on January 17, 2014, and was theatrically released in the United States on September 17. The Guest received generally positive reviews from critics.

Plot
Spencer and Laura Peterson, with their children Luke and Anna, are coping with the loss of their eldest son, Caleb, to the war in Afghanistan. They are visited by David Collins, a former U.S. Army sergeant who claims he was Caleb's best friend. He tells the family he wanted to visit them as a way to help Caleb take care of them. He is polite and friendly, and Laura invites him to stay as long as he wishes.

David hears of Spencer's troubles at work, and he sees Luke return home with a bruise on his face, caused by bullies at school. The next day, David and Luke follow the bullies to a bar, where David beats them up. He then uses his knowledge of the law, as well as a bribe, to convince the bartender not to tell anyone. That evening, David goes to a Halloween party with a reluctant Anna, where he makes a good impression with her friends, and later saves her friend Kristen from her violent ex-boyfriend. David and Kristen have sex, then David asks Anna's friend Craig where he can buy a gun. On their way home, Anna offers to make David a mix CD.

David gives Luke advice on dealing with bullies and gives him his butterfly knife. He meets Craig and his friend to buy the gun, but kills them and steals their weapons. When a suspicious Anna calls the military base to ask about David, she is told that he presumably died a week earlier. The call alerts a private corporation called the KPG, headed by Major Carver, who assembles a special forces team and heads for Peterson's home. Anna then learns about Craig's death, and that her boyfriend Zeke has been blamed for it. It is revealed that Spencer's boss died under mysterious circumstances, giving Spencer the promotion he always wanted. Anna asks Luke to research the numbers David has called on his phone.

At school, one of the bullies assaults Luke again, but he fights back by punching him in the face and hitting him with a yardstick. After they are both sent to the principal's office, David arrives and coerces the principal to give Luke a month of after-school detention, and threatens litigation if the principal expels him. Luke tells David of Anna's suspicions, but promises not to investigate any further or tell anyone else. While David helps Laura with the laundry, Major Carver's team attacks the house, but David kills all of them except for Carver. His cover blown, David stabs Laura with a kitchen knife. He then drives away, and kills Spencer as well.

Carver picks up Anna and informs her of her parents' deaths. He reveals that David was a test subject in a military medical experiment and was "programmed" to kill anyone who might compromise his identity, and is unlikely to be able to stop even if he wanted to. Meanwhile, David shoots Kristen in the chest and blows up the restaurant where she and Anna work. He goes to the school to kill Luke. Carver and Anna arrive at the school before David, and enter a haunted house set up for the Halloween dance. David turns off the lights and plays Anna's mix CD, then kills Luke's teacher and Carver with a boxcutter. Anna shoots David with Carver's gun, but David stabs her in the leg and attempts to choke her as the gun misfires and damages a light, starting a fire. Luke stabs David twice with the butterfly knife, which frees Anna. David tells Luke that he did the right thing and gives him a thumbs-up before collapsing.

Sitting in an ambulance, Anna and Luke overhear the firefighters say that only two corpses were recovered. As several firefighters exit the school, Anna notices one of them is limping; he turns to face her, and it is David using the disguise to quietly escape the scene.

Cast

 Dan Stevens as David Collins
 Maika Monroe as Anna Peterson
 Brendan Meyer as Luke Peterson
 Sheila Kelley as Laura Peterson
 Lance Reddick as Major Richard Carver
 Leland Orser as Spencer Peterson
 Tabatha Shaun as Kristen
 Chase Williamson as Zeke Hastings
 Ethan Embry as Higgins
 Joel David Moore as Craig
 Steven John Brown as Mike
 Brenden Wedner as Ian
 Alex Knight as Mr. Lyles
 Frank Bond as Mr. Alston
 Jesse Luken as Drew
 Kelsey Montoya as Jason
 Justin Yu as Blair
 A. J. Bowen as Austin
 Chris Ellis as Hendricks
 Candice K. Patton as Sgt. Halway
 Chris Harding as Caleb Peterson

Production

Writing 
Simon Barrett, who previously collaborated with Adam Wingard on the films A Horrible Way to Die and You're Next, wrote the script for The Guest. Barrett said, "one of the things that excites me the most is to have established a pre-existing dynamic like a nuclear family, then introduce an element that's disruptive [...] I love just movies where a stranger comes to town “High Plains Drifter"-style. Similarly to their previous films, Barrett envisioned The Guest with a main character "harboring a secret". The character was inspired by Barrett's former occupation as a private investigator; he said it "really compartmentalized my life [...] so I've become fascinated by characters that just have a weird interior thing going on". Keith Calder and Jessica Calder served as producers, who also produced You're Next. Wingard describes his working relationship with them as "positive" and "respectful".

Casting and filming 
Casting choices focused on character actors. On June 11, 2013, Dan Stevens signed on to star as the titular character, David. To prepare for the role, he spent hours in the gym to gain muscle. Wingard stated Stevens was the only serious contender for the role of David. "It was a very expedited schedule in terms of the casting [...] It was pretty much only Dan or bust", Wingard said. When casting Stevens, Barrett and Wingard knew that Stevens would be likable, and found him to be "calm and cool" and "naturally charming". They said the film title made the story obvious, and though audiences may cheer on his character for his entertainment value, he is clearly the antagonist of the film, something audiences will easily recognize. Maika Monroe was signed on for the role as Anna on June 26. On July 8, two additional cast members were confirmed; Brendan Meyer, who plays Luke, and Lance Reddick, who plays a Major Richard Carver.

On July 17, 2013, the New Mexico Film Office announced the start of the production of The Guest. Principal photography took place in various locations including Moriarty, Edgewood and Estancia, and continued until the end of August 2013. Monroe described the filming process as "light-hearted [...] There's a lot of comedy in The Guest, so it was a bit more fun".

Music 

Before filming began, Wingard thought about the music first. "For this film I was mostly inspired by electronic/goth bands of the 80s", he said. The film score was composed by Steve Moore, and includes synthwave tracks from artists such as Clan of Xymox and Survive. J-2 Music released the soundtrack on September 16, 2014.

Release
According to Wang, the rough cut of The Guest was about 20 minutes longer than the theatrical version. The rough cut was screened to a test audience, but viewers responded negatively, which resulted in shortening of the runtime. After another test screening, the audience were confused at the sudden arrival of Major Richard Carver and his team at the Peterson home, which is why some scenes with Carver at KPG headquarters were added in final cut of the film. Other footage which was edited or deleted after test screenings were scenes which explained what exactly "David" is, what happened to him, why he commits some of the acts in the story, and more details about the KPG program that he was involved in. Test audiences felt that the plot explanation was too much, a view shared by Wingard and Barrett, who "hated" explaining David's character and his background because they wanted to leave it ambiguous, and were thus happy to cut those scenes from the film.

On March 7, 2014, Picturehouse acquired the distribution rights to the film. To promote the film, the studio released a teaser trailer on June 26, 2014, followed by a second trailer on August 6.

Box office
The Guest premiered at the Sundance Film Festival on January 17, 2014. The film premiered in the United Kingdom on September 5, 2014 to 274 theaters. It finished in eighth place, grossing $511,040. After four weeks, the film grossed $1,352,579. The United States theatrical release was on September 17, 2014 to 19 theaters. During the first weekend, the film earned $84,527. At its widest release, the film was in 53 theaters. After six weeks, the film grossed $332,890, and earned $2.7 million worldwide.

Home media 
Universal Studios released The Guest on 2-disc DVD, and on Blu-ray with Digital Copy and UltraViolet abilities, on January 6, 2015. The DVD also includes an audio commentary by Wingard and Barrett, and 15-minutes of deleted scenes. In October 2021, the film was released on Ultra HD Blu-ray by Second Sight Films.

Critical response

Review aggregator website Rotten Tomatoes gives the film an approval rating of 91% based on 116 reviews, with an average rating of 7.5/10. The site's critics consensus states, "Boasting enough intelligence to bolster its darkly violent thrills, The Guest offers another treat for genre fans from director Adam Wingard." On Metacritic, the film has a weighted average score of 76 out of 100 based on 29 critics, indicating "generally favorable reviews".

Robert Abele of the Los Angeles Times described the film as a "dirty-sexy-funny homage to the vise-grip corkers that marked John Carpenter' and James Cameron's indie heyday", and praised Stevens' "killer personality" which brings The Guest to life. Another critic, Peter Travers of Rolling Stone, also agreed the film was "fun" and praised Stevens' "mesmerizing" performance. Writing for The New York Times, Jeannette Catsoulis complimented Wingard and Barrett's ability in tackling another familiar genre together; she thought Stevens' performance was restrained but "magnetic" at the story develops. London Evening Standard's Charlotte O'Sullivan was equally impressed by the director and writer duo; the critic gave the film 4 out of 5 stars and opined that Stevens' was "perfect" for the lead role. Dennis Harvey of Variety, while critical of the horror homage and ending, thought "The Guest is blood-soaked action trash of a high grade". He credited the soundtrack for underlining the film's vintage style. The reviewer from Spin magazine also praised the "quintessentially Halloween" soundtrack, and drew comparisons to it with the music from Drive (2011).

Of Stevens' performance, the critic from The Telegraph opined that it was reminiscent of Ryan Gosling in Drive and Only God Forgives (2013). However, he thought the logic in the film was lost in the third act, arguing Wingard was "a little shameless". Chuck Bowen of Slant magazine enjoyed the 1980s themes and cinematography. "Reds [...] are gorgeously vibrant, and the intentional grain texture, meant to give The Guest a somewhat timeless look, comes through subtly. The intentional glare of certain lighting is crisp, and the blacks are beautifully inky. The sound mix, which should be heard loud, boasts impressive nuance and heft", he wrote. Fearnet praised the cast performances and overall remarked that it was "a slick, fast, fun thriller flick." The A.V. Club gave the film a "B+" rating and said that "Dumb fun is rarely this smartly delivered." Bloody Good Horror gave the film a rating of 8/10 and commented, "Mixing elements from such classics like Halloween, The Terminator, and using the framework of Molière's hidden-identity classic Tartuffe keeps this modern 80's thriller on par with some of the best homages seen in recent memory."

Accolades

References

External links
 
 
 
 

2014 films
2014 action thriller films
2014 crime thriller films
2014 independent films
2014 psychological thriller films
2010s mystery thriller films
2010s serial killer films
American action thriller films
American crime thriller films
American independent films
American mystery thriller films
American psychological thriller films
American serial killer films
Films about families
American films about Halloween
Films directed by Adam Wingard
Films shot in New Mexico
HanWay Films films
Films produced by Keith Calder
Films with screenplays by Simon Barrett (filmmaker)
2010s English-language films
2010s American films